Stan Woodell (1928 – 24 April 2004) was a British botanist.

Stanley Reginald John Woodell was born in Shepherd's Bush, London.

He obtained a degree in Botany from Durham University. An undergraduate at Hatfield College, Woodell was a member of the Durham University Exploration Society. He studied the pollination biology of the genus Primula for his PhD at the same university.

Career
He was a University Lecturer in Botany at Oxford University (1959–88). At Wolfson College, Oxford, he was successively a Governing Body Fellow (1967–88), Supernumerary Fellow (1988–89) and Emeritus Fellow (1989–2004). From 1984 to 2004 he was also the Fellow Librarian of the College.

As a botanist, Woodell co-wrote the Flora of Oxfordshire published in 1998, to which his fellow botanist and colleague Humphry Bowen contributed.

Woodell died aged 75. A black poplar tree (Populus nigra) was planted at Wolfson College on 22 November 2004 in his memory.

References

External links 
 Oxford University Gazette notice
 Wolfson College notice

1928 births
2004 deaths
English botanists
English librarians
English non-fiction writers
British nature writers
People from Shepherd's Bush
Fellows of Wolfson College, Oxford
English male non-fiction writers
Alumni of Hatfield College, Durham
20th-century English male writers